Portus was a large artificial harbour of Ancient Rome. Sited on the north bank of the north mouth of the Tiber, on the Tyrrhenian coast, it was established by Claudius and enlarged by Trajan to supplement the nearby port of Ostia.

The archaeological remains of the harbour are near the modern-day Italian village of Porto within the Comune of Fiumicino, just south of Rome in Lazio (ancient Latium).

Ancient Portus

Claudian phase

Rome's original harbour was Ostia. The foundation of this lighthouse was provided by filling one of the massive obelisk ships, used to transport an obelisk from Egypt to adorn the spina of Vatican Circus, built during the reign of Caligula. The harbour opened directly to the sea on the northwest and communicated with the Tiber by a channel on the southeast.

The goal was to obtain protection from the prevalent southwest wind, to which the river mouth was exposed. Though Claudius, in the inscription which he erected in AD 46, stated that he had freed the city of Rome from the danger of inundation, his work was only partially successful: in AD 62 Tacitus speaks of a number of grain ships sinking within the harbour during a violent storm. Nero gave the harbour the name of "Portus Augusti".

The Via Portuensis ran over the hills as far as the modern Ponte Galeria, and then straight across the plain. An older road, the Via Campana, ran along the foot of the hills, following the right bank of the Tiber. It passed the grove of the Arval Brothers at the sixth mile, to the Campus salinarum romanarum, the saltmarsh on the right bank from which it derived its name.

Trajanic phase

In AD 103 Trajan constructed another harbour farther inland—a hexagonal basin enclosing an area of 39 hectares (97 acres). It communicated by canals with the harbour of Claudius, with the Tiber directly, and with the sea, the last now forming the navigable arm of the Tiber, reopened for traffic by Gregory XIII and again by Paul V. The new canal bore the name Fossa trajana, though its origin is undoubtedly due to Claudius. The basin itself is still preserved, and is now a reedy lagoon. It was surrounded by extensive warehouses, remains of which may still be seen: the fineness of the brickwork of which they are built is remarkable.

"Portus was the main port of ancient Rome for more than 500 years and provided a conduit for everything from glass, ceramics, marble and slaves to wild animals caught in Africa and shipped to Rome for spectacles in the Colosseum."

In 2010, "one of the biggest canals ever built by the Romans" was discovered in Portus, in an ancient port increasingly being seen as important as Carthage or Alexandria. It connected Portus with Ostia. It connected to the Fosse Traiana and pointed south. For some 400 years, from the late second century AD into the fifth and sixth centuries, this 100-yard-wide (90 meter) canal was used to ship goods from all over the Empire to Rome.

Effects on Ostia
By means of these works Portus captured the main share of the harbour traffic of Rome. Though the importance of Ostia did not immediately decrease, Portus was already an episcopal see in Constantine's time not very long, if at all, after Ostia, and as the only harbour in the time of the Gothic wars.

Its abandonment dates from the partial silting up of the right arm of the Tiber in the Middle Ages, which restored to Ostia what little traffic was left. To the west of the harbour is the cathedral of Saint Rufina, 10th century, but modernized except for the campanile, and the episcopal palace, fortified in the Middle Ages, and containing a number of ancient inscriptions from the site. On the island (Isola Sacra) just opposite is the church of S. Ippolito, built on the site of a Roman building, with a picturesque medieval campanile (13th century ?), as well as the Isola Sacra Necropolis.

It is a frazione, or portion of the commune of Rome.  to the north is the pumping station by which the lowland, formerly called Stagno di Maccarese, now reclaimed and traversed by many drainage canals, between there and Maccarese is kept drained (Bonifica di Maccarese).

Current remains
The site can still be fairly clearly traced in the low ground to the east of Fiumicino. The lighthouse is represented on coins, mosaics, bas-reliefs such as the Torlonia Harbor Relief. The harbour is generally supposed to have been protected by two moles with a breakwater in front, on which stood the lighthouse, with an entrance on each side of it. Trial soundings made in 1907 showed that the course of the right-hand mole is represented by a low sand-hill, while the central breakwater was only some 170 m long, and probably divided from each of the two moles by a channel 135 m wide.

The existence of two entrances is in accordance with the evidence of coins and literary tradition, though the position of that on the left is not certain, and it may have been closed in later times. The whole course of the left-hand mole has not yet been traced, but it seems to have protected not only the south-west but also a considerable portion of the north-west side of the harbour.

Many other remains of buildings exist. They were more easily traceable in the 16th century when Pirro Ligorio and Antonio Labacco made plans of the harbour. Considerable excavations were carried out in 1868, but with the idea of recovering works of art and antiquities. The plan and description given by Rodolfo Lanciani (Annali del institute, 1868, 144 sqq.) were made under unfavourable circumstances.

Medieval and modern town
The division between the ancient settlement and the medieval Porto began in the 4th century AD, when Emperor Constantine the Great had a line of walls built.

Ostia, just opposite, on the left bank of the Tiber, was increasingly depopulated after Vandal and Saracen attacks. Porto was the main port on the Tyrrhenian Sea until the 6th century AD. Later it decayed, but maintained some importance as the episcopal see which, from 313, was made independent from that in Ostia. Ostia and Porto both were chosen to be amongst the seven suburbicarian dioceses, which are still in existence, and reserved for the members of the highest order of Catholic Cardinals, the Cardinal Bishops, so the prelates of these otherwise insignificant Roman suburbs outrank all archbishops, even the patriarchs.

The remains of Porto are today included administratively in the municipality of Fiumicino.

As part of Parco Archeologico di Ostia Antica the remains of Porto are open every Thursday, the first and the third Sunday of the month from 9:30 to 13:30, and upon request and advance booking at other times.

See also
 Caligula's Giant Ship
 History of Rome
 Isola Sacra
 Roman navy

References

 
 

 Attribution

Further reading

External links
 Diocese of Porto-Santa Rufina
 Portus Project official website
 1573 woodcut of Portus
 
 Information and images of Portus 
 Model of Portus in the Museo della Via Ostiense, Rome
 visitor information 

1st-century establishments in Italy
Ancient ports and harbours
Archaeological sites in Lazio
Fiumicino
Former populated places in Italy
Roman harbors in Italy
Roman harbors
Roman sites in Lazio